John Dennis Johnston (born May 14, 1950) is an American film and television actor.

Career
He appeared in a number of feature films including Close Encounters of the Third Kind, Streets of Fire, and Flesh+Blood, as well as various TV series such as In Plain Sight and The Golden Girls.

He appeared in both Twilight Zone: The Movie in 1983 and in one episode of the Twilight Zone TV series in 1987.

Personal life
Johnston attended Hunter College in New York City where he studied drama under Lloyd Richards and Harold Clurman. In 1981, he married Karla Pitti, daughter of the cowboy-singer and actor Carl Pitti. They later separated.

An avid cyclist, he is a cycling safety activist who has pushed for safe-driving legislation.

Selected filmography 

 Captains and the Kings (1972, TV miniseries) .... Medical Orderly
 Police Woman (1976–1977, TV series) .... Arky / Bishoff
 Roots (1977, TV Mini-Series) .... Man At Cockfight
 Annie Hall (1977) .... Police Officer 
 The Rockford Files (1976–1977, TV series) .... Henry Schlager / Grady Northcourt
 Close Encounters of the Third Kind (1977) .... Special Forces
 Kiss Meets the Phantom of the Park (1978, TV Movie) .... 'Chopper'
 The Rose (1979) .... Milledge
 Knots Landing  (1980, TV Series) .... Alien
 Charlie's Angels (1976–1980, TV Series) .... Harley Mason / Jerry Adams
 Back Roads (1981) .... Gilly
 Best of the West (1982, TV Series) - Curtis
 The Beast Within (1982) .... Horace Platt
 The Executioner's Song (1982, TV Movie) .... Jimmy - Poker Game
 The Blue and the Gray (1982, TV Mini-Series) .... Lieutenant Hardy
 Jekyll and Hyde... Together Again (1982) .... Macho Kid
 48 Hrs. (1982) .... Torchy's Patron
 Reckless (1983)
 Twilight Zone: The Movie (1983) .... Co-Pilot (segment "Nightmare at 20,000 Feet")
 The Rousters (1983, TV Movie) 
 The Dukes of Hazzard (1983, TV Series) .... 'Sledge' Beaudry
 Lone Star Country (1983)
 Streets of Fire (1984) .... Pete The Mechanic
 A Breed Apart (1984) .... Miller
 The A-Team (1983-1985, TV series) .... Archer / 'Snake'
 Pale Rider (1985) .... Deputy Tucker
 Flesh+Blood (1985) .... Summer
 The New Twilight Zone (1987, TV series, episode: "The Junction") .... Charlie (segment "The Junction")
 St. Elsewhere (1986–1987, TV Series) .... Nick Moats
 Extreme Prejudice (1987) .... 'Merv'
 Married... with Children (1987, TV series, episode: "How Do You Spell Revenge?") .... Jimmy
 The Squeeze (1987) .... Nick
 Sunset (1988) .... Ed
 Pink Cadillac (1989) .... Waycross
 Communion (1989) .... Fireman
 Golden Girls (1989, TV series, episode: "Mary Has A Little Lamb") .... Merrill
 Murder in Mississippi (1990, TV movie) .... Hatchet-Faced Man
 Matlock (1991–1992, TV series)
 In the Best Interest of the Children (1992, TV Movie) .... Harlan Pepper
 Reasonable Doubts (1992, TV Series) .... Carl Lorkey / Carl Lurkee
 Highlander: The Series (1992, TV series, episode: "Mountain Men") .... Carl The Hermit
 Wyatt Earp (1994) .... Frank Stillwell
 Wagons East! (1994) .... Cattle Rustler (uncredited)
 Art Deco Detective (1994) .... Detective Arthur Decowitz
 In Pursuit of Honor (1995, TV Movie) .... Sergeant Thomas Mulcahey
 White Dwarf (1995, TV Movie) .... Morgus, Osh's Assistant
 A Walk in the Clouds (1995) .... Lout #1
 Wild Bill (1995) .... Ed Plummer
 The Siege at Ruby Ridge (1996, TV Movie) .... Tony Vickers
 Precious Find (1996) .... Bartender
 Forest Warrior (1996) .... Williams
 Millennium (1996, TV series, episode: "Broken World") - Sheriff Falkner
 Snide and Prejudice (1997) .... Sheffield
 Joseph's Gift (1998) .... Parker
 Heartwood (1998) .... Carl Burris
 Purgatory (1999, TV Movie) .... Lamb / 'Lefty' Slade
 Perfect Murder, Perfect Town (2000, TV movie)
 Walker, Texas Ranger (1996–2001, TV series) ....  Mike Shilts / Cody Diggs
 Firestarter: Rekindled (2002, TV Mini-Series) .... Joel Lowen
 JAG (2003, TV Series) .... Barclay Cale
 Without a Trace (2005, TV Series) .... Patrick Orton
 Supernatural (2006, TV Series) .... Pa Bender
 In Plain Sight (2009–2010, TV series, episodes: "Father Goes West" and "Don't Cry for Me, Albuquerque") .... Dr. Bronstein
 The Gertrude Stein Mystery or Some Like It Art (2010; episode: "Deep Throat")

References

External links 
 

1950 births
American male film actors
American male television actors
20th-century American male actors
21st-century American male actors
Living people